Deh-e Ziar (also Romanized as Deh-e Zīār, Deh Zeyār, and Deh Zīār; also known as Deh Yār) is a village in Kavirat Rural District, Chatrud District, Kerman County, Kerman Province, Iran. At the 2006 census, its population was 2,224, in 574 families.

References 

Populated places in Kerman County